Pedestal is a support or a stand for a statue or other object.

Pedestal may also refer to:

Science, technology, engineering, architecture 
 Pedestal crater
 Pedestal desk
 Pedestal table, a table with a single central leg
 Pedestal toilet for sitting, as opposed to squat toilet for squatting
 Camera pedestal, a column with a steerable base used to mount a television camera 
 Telecommunications pedestal, a ground-level housing for a passive connection point for underground cables.
 Term used in electronic measurement for the measured value when no input signal is given.

Art and media 
 "Pedestal", a song by Alanis Morissette from her 2020 album Such Pretty Forks in the Road
 "Pedestal", a song by Fergie from her 2006 album The Dutchess
 "Pedestal", a song by Portishead from their 1994 album Dummy
 "The Pedestal", a poem by Patti Smith from her 1996 book The Coral Sea
 The Pedestal, a novel by George Lanning, published in 1966

Military 
Operation Pedestal, British operation to get vital supplies to the island of Malta in August 1942 during World War II

See also
 
 
 Ped (disambiguation)